Çobankənd (also, Chobankend) is a village and municipality in the Gadabay Rayon of Azerbaijan.  It has a population of 1,802.  The municipality consists of the villages of Çobankənd and Yenikənd.

References 

Populated places in Gadabay District